Power Rangers Lightspeed Rescue is a video game based on the 8th season of the TV series Power Rangers Lightspeed Rescue. Four very different versions of the game were produced for the Game Boy Color, Macintosh/Windows, Nintendo 64 and PlayStation by various developers and publishers.

Nintendo 64 version
The Nintendo 64 version features 3D action-based gameplay of the Rangers, their Vehicles, and Mega Zords. It supports for 1 or 2 players simultaneously. Villains from the show such as Diabolico act as the antagonists and the game features voice clips by the actual Power Rangers Lightspeed actors and actresses. The game is also compatible with the Nintendo Controller Pak to save games in progress.

PlayStation version
The PlayStation version is similar to the Nintendo 64 one in terms of graphics but gameplay was quite different. It features the main five Rangers as playable characters with the Titanium Ranger as an extra unlockable character. The game can be played as one or two player mode and also features voice clips by the actual Power Rangers Lightspeed Rescue actors and actresses. Once chosen, the player/players stay as the chosen ranger/rangers for the whole game. For the Megazord Battle, the player on controller one can use the Supertrain Megazord. For the final stage, it's replaced with the Omega Megazord. Another special feature for the game is a password system, where special cheat codes can give the rangers infinite health, lives, continues and powered up attacks, as well as access to an art and picture gallery, the option to begin the game on any of the first six of the seven levels and the Titanium Ranger. The Final stage of the game can only be accessed if the player saves the game on the PlayStation Memory Card after completing the penultimate one.

Game Boy Color version
The Game Boy Color version is a side-scrolling platformer. It featured all five rangers as playable characters and utilized a password save system.

Reception 

Power Rangers: Lightspeed Rescue received “generally unfavorable reviews” according to the review aggregator Metacritic.

References

External links
Computer, Nintendo 64, and PlayStation versions at MobyGames

2000 video games
Game Boy Color games
Classic Mac OS games
THQ games
Natsume (company) games
Nintendo 64 games
PlayStation (console) games
Power Rangers Lightspeed Rescue
Power Rangers video games
Video games developed in Japan
Video games developed in the United Kingdom
Video games featuring female protagonists
Video games scored by Matthew Simmonds
Windows games
Superhero video games
Video games developed in the United States